Pil Tor is a granite tor on the eastern edge of Dartmoor, England.

References

Tors of Dartmoor
Teignbridge